Dexter Marsh is a  marsh located at the eastern end of Lake Ontario in Dexter, New York. It was declared a National Natural Landmark in May 1973.

The marsh is managed by the New York State Department of Environmental Conservation as the Dexter Marsh Wildlife Management Area. The marsh is a popular fishing and trapping area as well as a migratory bird layover. Lacking barrier beaches, it is directly exposed to Lake Ontario's winds and waves.  It is a relatively undeveloped bay-head area on the Great Lakes.

See also
List of National Natural Landmarks in New York
List of New York state wildlife management areas

References

External links
 NYS Department of Environmental Conservation: Dexter Marsh
 Map of Dexter Marsh

National Natural Landmarks in New York (state)
Wildlife management areas of New York (state)
Protected areas of Jefferson County, New York
Landforms of Jefferson County, New York
Marshes of New York (state)